Fraser Ross McMains is an American-born New Zealand basketball coach. He is currently an assistant coach with the Louisville Cardinals men's college basketball team.

Early life and career
McMains was born in New Hampshire in the United States before growing up in New Zealand on Waiheke Island. He attended Kadimah College in Auckland, having to take the boat to school every day. He returned to the U.S. at age 11 when his family moved to Santa Barbara. There he went to Santa Barbara High School. After high school, he returned to New Zealand and got a job working with the New Zealand Breakers organisation in 2007. A year or so later, he returned to the U.S. and started in player development, working with a mix of pro players in Los Angeles. That led to an opportunity to work with players in Latvia, France, and China. He also ran NBA Pre-Draft Preparation for two years in Santa Barbara, while also running off-season workouts for a selection of NBA and international players. During this time, he studied at Santa Monica College (2008–10) and John Cabot University (2011) in Rome, Italy. He was exposed to European basketball while in Rome.

Coaching career
McMains' coaching career began as a special assistant – a role that saw him focus on player development – with the Sacramento Kings for the 2012–13 NBA season, before spending the next two seasons with Sacramento's D-League affiliate, the Reno Bighorns. He returned to New Zealand in 2015 and was named assistant coach for the New Zealand Tall Blacks. He went on to win the NZNBL Coach of the Year as head coach of the Taranaki Mountainairs in 2016. From there, he returned to the United States and spent two seasons in the NBA G League as an assistant coach with the Santa Cruz Warriors and Westchester Knicks, before joining the New York Knicks for the 2018–19 season as head video coordinator.

In August 2019, McMains was appointed an assistant coach with Melbourne United of the Australian NBL. He parted ways with Melbourne in August 2020.

In May 2021, McMains was appointed an assistant coach with the Louisville Cardinals men's college basketball team.

References

External links
New Zealand Breakers' 2014 article on McMains

Living people
American expatriate basketball people in New Zealand
American men's basketball coaches
American men's basketball players
Louisville Cardinals men's basketball coaches
Melbourne United coaches
Reno Bighorns coaches
Sacramento Kings assistant coaches
Santa Cruz Warriors coaches
Westchester Knicks coaches
Year of birth missing (living people)